The Commentary on Anatomy in Avicenna's Canon is a manuscript written in the 13th century by the Arab physician Ibn al-Nafis. The manuscript was discovered in 1924 in the archives of the Prussian State Library in Berlin, Germany. It contains the earliest descriptions of the coronary circulation and pulmonary circulation systems.

Latin translation

The manuscript was translated into Latin by the Italian physician Andrea Alpago, In 1520, Alpago returned to Padua with a Latin translation of the commentary, after living  in the Arabian Peninsula for 30 years.

Reception 

{{Commentary by Dr. (Ibn al-Nafis regarding the Canon of Avicenna is well documented.}} Many scholars recognize this polymath as the discoverer of the pulmonary circulation.

See also 
 The Canon of Medicine

References 

Medical manuscripts
Medical works of the medieval Islamic world
Avicenna